Dhamaka is a 2022 Indian Telugu-language action comedy film directed by Trinadha Rao Nakkina and written by  Prasanna Kumar Bezawada. It stars Ravi Teja, Jayaram and Sreeleela. The film is produced by People Media Factory and Abhishek Agarwal Arts.

Principal photography commenced in October 2021 and ended in September 2022. The filming took place in parts of Hyderabad and Spain. Cinematography has been done by Karthik Ghattamaneni. The film was theatrically released on 23 December 2022, during the Christmas weekend.

Dhamaka opened to mixed reviews from critics, where it became a commercial success upon release. The film has grossed over 100 crores worldwide, making it the one of the highest-grossing Telugu film of 2022.

Plot 
Jayam Pakshitap alias J. P., a business magnate and head of "J. P. Orbit", is known for taking over companies in a ruthless manner. He sets his sights on Nanda Gopal Chakravarthy's "People Mart" and decides to present it as a birthday gift to his son, Atharva Pakshitap. However, J. P. faces problems from Nanda Gopal's son Anand Chakravarthy, who is also the company's upcoming CEO. He decides to overthrow him and acquire the company.

Meanwhile, Swami is a street-smart unemployed man and his doppelganger Anand, who lives with his family consisting of his father Vasudeva Rao, mother Yashoda, and younger sister Subbu. He tries to find work unsuccessfully and constantly is burdened by Subbu's impending wedding. Pranavi is Subbu's friend, who meets Swami while planning for Subbu's wedding. They get attracted to each other. However, Pranavi's father and Chakravarthy's friend, Ramesh Reddy instead arranges a marriage alliance with Anand. Initially, Pranavi is confused upon seeing Anand; whether to choose Swami over Anand and ultimately rejects the proposal, due to which Ramesh sends goons to kill Swami. 

At the same time, Atharva and his goons corner Anand to kill him. Pranavi calls Swami for help but later learns that Anand and Swami are the same people. Swami thrashes both Ramesh and Atharva's goons, but gets knocked out by one of them, and is presumed dead. However, Swami survives and fakes his death. Pranavi asks him about living as dual people. Swami reveals that he met Chakravarthy in his childhood when he and Vasudeva went missing at the local fair, and Chakravarthy tried to locate Swami's parents. However, he instead adopted him as his son. 4 years later, Swami's parents arrived in search of him and Chakravarthy was hesitant to send him back with them. Thus, to keep both families happy, he then assumed dual identities. 

Meanwhile, J. P., who is under the impression that Anand is dead, asks Swami to act as Anand and makes the company shares be distributed to J. P. Orbit. A sequence of comedic events ensues, where Swami manages to fool both J. P. and Atharva every time while arranging Subbu's marriage and donating his shares to the employees. However, J. P. discovers Swami's dual identities and tries to kill Chakravarthy, but Swami saves him. He also saves Vasudeva and thrashes both J. P. and Atharva. Swami reveals to Chakravarthy that his nephew, Vikram Chakravarthy, was also behind the attempt on Swami's life, as he became an obstacle for him to become the next CEO.

Swami tells Vikram that Chakravarthy wanted him to become the CEO, upon which Vikram realizes his mistake and apologizes to both Swami and his family, reuniting with them. With Vikram becoming the CEO, Swami and Pranavi happily get married, and both families lead normal and happy life.

Cast

Production 
The film's title was revealed in October 2021. Principal photography of the film began on 4 October 2021. The first schedule was completed in November 2021. The makers shot an action sequence in February 2022 in Hyderabad. The makers also shot a song in Spain's Plaza de España in March 2022. The filming was wrapped on 22 September 2022.

Music
The music of the film is composed by Bheems Ceciroleo. The first single titled "Jinthaak" was released on 18 August 2022. The second single titled "Mass Raja" was released on 23 September 2022.

Release

Theatrical
Dhamaka was theatrically released on 23 December 2022. The worldwide theatrical rights of the film were sold at a cost of ₹18.30 crore. The Hindi dubbing rights were sold at a cost of ₹10 crore, whereas the satellite and digital streaming rights were sold for ₹20 crore.

Home Media
The satellite and digital rights of the film were acquired by Netflix and Star Maa. It was released on 22 January 2023 for streaming.

Reception

Critical reception 
Dhamaka received mixed reviews from critics and audience.

123Telugu gave 3 out of 5 stars and wrote "On the whole, Dhamaka is an action drama that has regular mass elements. But Ravi Teja is back with his energetic avatar and keeps you glued to the screens with his entertaining performance. Added bonuses are the hit songs and comedy scenes. If you ignore the routine storyline and keep your expectations in check, you will end up liking the film." Paul Nicodemus of The Times of India gave 3 out of 5 stars and wrote "Overall, Dhamaka is an action-packed comedy that relies heavily on mass entertainment quotient. Ravi Teja’s energy and Sreeleela’s glamour make this routine story an entertaining watch." 

Ram Venkat Srikar of Cinema Express gave 3 out of 5 stars and wrote "Dhamaka, in all, delivers what it promised. It is a self-aware entertainer that doesn't want to do anything more than entertain the audience. It feels engineered to cater to the masses, but that's fine because it largely succeeds in doing what it set out to do."Idlebrain gave 2.75 out of 5 stars and wrote "Dhamaka depends majorly on Ravi Teja’s energetic/comic performance and entertainment/mass episodes. A better second half would have done wonders to the film. It works partly and is going to entertain all classes to a certain degree." 

Srivathsan Nadadhur of OTTplay gave 2.5 out of 5 stars and wrote "Dhamaka lacks a novel plot but it gives exactly what would one expect from a typical Ravi Teja entertainer and a director like Trinadha Rao Nakkina, who has films like Cinema Choopista Mama and Nenu Local under his belt. Sreeleela proves to be a natural with comedy and the song-dance routine, continuing her good form after Pelli SandaD. However, the star of the show is Prasanna Kumar Bezawada, with his terrific one-liners and an entertaining screenplay."
Janani K of India Today rated the film 2 out of 5 stars and wrote "10 minutes into the film, we get a deja vu feeling as it reminds you of Ala Vaikunthapurramuloo". Balakrishna Ganeshan of The News Minute rated the film 1.5 out of 5 stars and wrote "The genre of Dhamaka is fluid. It keeps jumping from one genre to another and finally ends up being a different variant of Trivikram’s Ala Vaikunthapurramuloo".

Box office 
Dhamaka grossed ₹10 crore worldwide on its opening day, including ₹7.55 crore gross domestically (India). The opening day share from Andhra Pradesh and Telangana markets together stood at ₹4.40 crore. In its opening weekend, the film has collected a worldwide gross of ₹32 crore. In India, the film has made a net collection of ₹20.50 crore in the opening weekend surpassing the Hindi film Cirkus which opened to ₹20.10 crore.

News18 Telugu reported the worldwide gross to be 68.45 crore, after 11 days of the release, with a distributors' share of 36.17 crore. After 14 days, 123telugu reported that the film grossed 100 crore, thus becoming a commercial success at the box office.

References

External links 
 
 Dhamaka at Rotten Tomatoes
 Dhamaka at FilmiBeat

Films shot in Hyderabad, India
Films shot in Spain
Indian action comedy films
2022 action comedy films
2020s Telugu-language films
2022 films
Films set in Hyderabad, India
Films directed by Trinadha Rao Nakkina
Films scored by Bheems Ceciroleo